The Stein House at 420 Cedar St. in Ashland, Kansas is a three-bedroom Westchester Deluxe model Lustron house built in 1950.  It was listed on the National Register of Historic Places in 2001.

It was built by Merlyn Weidenheiner of Kinsley, Kansas.

It includes a three-car Lustron garage.

References

External links

Houses on the National Register of Historic Places in Kansas
Houses completed in 1950
Clark County, Kansas
Lustron houses in Kansas